Mushak (also Romanized as Mūshak) is a village in Barkuh Rural District, Kuhsorkh County, Razavi Khorasan Province, Iran. At the 2006 census, its population was 1,171, in 331 families.

References 

Populated places in Kuhsorkh County